Dianthus pungens  is a herbaceous perennial plant belonging to the family Caryophyllaceae native to France and Spain.

References

pungens
Flora of France
Flora of Spain